Madonna and Child with St John the Baptist and St Augustine is a c.1494 painting by Perugino of the Madonna and Child enthroned between John the Apostle and Augustine of Hippo. It is in the church of Sant'Agostino in Cremona. It was commissioned in 1493 by the rich Roncadelli family, and the following year he painted it at his Florence studio before shipping it to Cremona. It is signed and dated on the throne Petrus Perusinus pinxit MCCCCLXXXXIIII (Peter of Perugia painted [this] 1494).

It was taken to France by the occupying forces after the Treaty of Tolentino in 1797 and returned in 1815. However, it was not put back in its original position on a side altar on the north side of the nave but on another side altar on the south side of the nave. It was restored in 1999.

Bibliography (in Italian)
 Vittoria Garibaldi, Perugino, in Pittori del Rinascimento, Scala, Florence, 2004 
 Pierluigi De Vecchi, Elda Cerchiari, I tempi dell'arte, volume 2, Bompiani, Milan, 1999. 
 Stefano Zuffi, Il Quattrocento, Electa, Milan, 2004. 

Paintings of the Madonna and Child by Pietro Perugino
1494 paintings
Perugino
Perugino